is a stable of sumo wrestlers, one of the Nishonoseki ichimon or group of stables. It was formed in 1974 by former ōzeki Maenoyama, and was originally in the Takasago group of stables before joining the Nishonoseki ichimon. A series of wrestlers from Taiwan were recruited in the late 1980s. Later a Mongolian, Maenoyu, was at the stable from 2004 until 2007, but there have been no foreigners recruited since Maenoyu's retirement and the current stablemaster has indicated there are no plans to do in the immediate future. As of January 2023, it had 19 wrestlers. 
Takadagawa stable is currently home to the 41rst Shikimori Inosuke.

History 
In 1998, the Japan Sumo Association board election nominated Takadagawa as trustee. However, he did not follow the Takasago clan's candidacy and ran for office by himself, causing a dispute. Takadagawa was excommunicated from the ichimon and the stable became independent. As he was approaching the mandatory retirement age, Maenoyama handed over control to Futagoyama stable's former sekiwake Akinoshima in 2009, as Akinoshima had dissension with the head coach at his stable. In 2011, the stable joined the Nishonoseki ichimon ending nearly thirteen years of non-alignment with an ichimon.

The stable did not have any sekitori between Dairaidō′s  last appearance in jūryō in July 2006 and the promotion of Ryūden in September 2012, where he lasted for only one tournament before reaching sekitoriship again in November 2016. In September 2014 Kagayaki reached jūryō, ending Takadagawa's sekitori drought. Kagayaki went on to reach the top makuuchi division in January 2016, the first Takadagawa wrestler to do so since Kenkō in 1992. Ryūden then reached the top division himself in January 2018.

On 10 April 2020, the Sumo Association announced that an undisclosed wrestler had tested positive for the coronavirus. It was later confirmed to be Shobushi of Takadagawa Stable, a sandanme wrestler who died from coronavirus complications on 13 May 2020. It had also been announced in late April 2020 that seven individuals, including Takadagawa's stablemaster and jūryō wrestler Hakuyozan, were hospitalized after testing positive for the virus. The stable was only one of the 45 stables in sumo not included in the "all-clear" antibody test results issued by the Sumo Association on 6 July 2020. The tate-gyōji at the stable, Shikimori Inosuke, missed the July 2020 tournament with an unspecified illness.

Ring name conventions 
Some wrestlers at this stable have taken ring names or shikona that begin with the characters 安芸 (read: aki), in deference to their coach and the stable's owner, the former Akinoshima. Examples as of 2017 include Akinohana and Akinoyama.

Owners 

2009–present: 9th Takadagawa (iin, former sekiwake Akinoshima)
1974-2009: 8th Takadagawa (former ōzeki Maenoyama)

Notable active wrestlers 

Ryūden (best rank komusubi)
Kagayaki (best rank maegashira)
 (best rank jūryō)
 (best rank juryo)
 (best rank juryo)

Coach 
Hanakago Tadaaki (riji, former sekiwake Daijuyama)

Assistant 
Zenshinyama (wakaimonogashira, former jūryō, real name Ryōta Akimoto)

Notable former members 
Maenoshin (former komusubi)
Kenkō (former komusubi)
Shobushi (former sandanme)
 (former maegashira)

Referee 
41st Shikimori Inosuke (tate-gyōji, real name Hideki Imaoka)
Kimura Mitsunosuke (jūryō gyōji, real name Makoto Kawahara)
Shikimori Tatsunosuke (Sandanme Gyoji, real name Keisuke Mizutani)

Hairdresser 
Tokotetsu (1st class tokoyama)

Location and access 
Tokyo, Kōtō ward, Kiyosumi 2-15-7
2 minute walk from Kiyosumi-shirakawa Station on the Ōedo Line and Hanzōmon Line

See also 
List of sumo stables
List of active sumo wrestlers
List of past sumo wrestlers
Glossary of sumo terms

References

External links 
Official site 
Japan Sumo Association profile

Active sumo stables